Van Fossen is a surname. Notable people with the surname include:

Jamie Van Fossen (born 1960), American politician
Jim Van Fossen, American politician, father of Jamie

Surnames of Dutch origin